Pelia may refer to:

 Pelpa or Pelīā, a village in Iran
 Pelia, a Greek mythological figure
 Pelia (crab), a genus of spider crabs in subfamily Pisinae of Epialtidae
 Peria (butterfly) or Pelia, a genus in subfamily Biblidinae of nymphalid butterflies

See also
Pella (disambiguation)